Thomas William Tucker (born July 15, 1945) is an American mathematician, the Charles Hetherington Professor of Mathematics at Colgate University, and an expert in the area of topological graph theory.

Tucker did his undergraduate studies at Harvard University, graduating in 1967, and obtained his Ph.D. from Dartmouth College in 1971, under the supervision of Edward Martin Brown.

Tucker's father, Albert W. Tucker, was also a professional mathematician, and his brother, Alan Tucker, and son, Thomas J. Tucker, are also professional mathematicians.

References

20th-century American mathematicians
21st-century American mathematicians
Harvard University alumni
Dartmouth College alumni
Colgate University faculty
Graph theorists
Living people
1945 births
Mathematicians from New York (state)